Agrate Brianza is a comune (municipality) in the Province of Monza and Brianza in the Italian region Lombardy, located about  northeast of Milan.

Notable people
 Clement Vismara (1897–1988), missionary
 Valentino Giambelli (1928), builder
 Mino Reitano (1944–2009), singer-songwriter
Marco d'Agrate (1504–1574), sculptor

Immigration 
 Demographic Statistics

Twin towns
 Česká Třebová, Czech Republic

References

External links
 Official website

Populated places on Brianza